The CW is an American television network, which launched on September 18, 2006 as a programming and management consolidation of its two predecessors The WB (majority-owned by Time Warner) and UPN (owned at the time of that network's shutdown by CBS Corporation), both of which began broadcasting in January 1995.

The network currently has over-the-air coverage on thirty-six owned-and-operated stations and 192 affiliates available on analog, low-power or digital broadcast signals (primarily covering the 100 largest Nielsen-designated markets with moderate over-the-air coverage in smaller markets); and 17 additional local affiliates distributed exclusively through cable television providers. Counting only its broadcast affiliates, The CW covers 99.80% of all households in the United States with at least one television set.

The following article is a listing of CW-affiliated television stations, arranged alphabetically by state and territory, and based on the station's city of license and followed in parentheses by the Designated Market Area if differing from the city of license. There are links to and articles on most of the stations, describing their histories, local programming and technical information, such as broadcast frequencies.

For broadcast affiliates, the station's advertised channel number follows the call letters. In most cases, this is the station's virtual channel (PSIP) number.

Stations listed in boldface are owned and operated by the CW's majority owner Nexstar Media Group. Stations listed with the superscript identification CW+ are broadcast or cable affiliates of The CW Plus, a programming service distributed mainly to areas ranked among the 110 smallest U.S. television markets, which alongside CW network programming, carries syndicated and brokered programs acquired and scheduled by the network.

United States

Alabama
 Bessemer – WDBB 17 (satellite of WTTO)
 Dothan – WRGX-LD2 23.2 / WTVY-DT3 4.3 (simulcast of WRGX-LD2)CW+, 1
 Gulf Shores (Mobile) – WFNA 55
 Homewood (Birmingham) – WTTO 21 (ATSC 3.0 TV Station) / WIAT (ATSC 1.0 Simulcast)
 Huntsville – WHDF 15
 Montgomery – WBMM 22CW+, 1

Alaska
 Anchorage – KYUR-DT2 13.2CW+, 1
 Fairbanks – KATN-DT3 2.3CW+, 1
 Juneau – KJUD-DT2 8.2CW+, 1

Arizona
 Phoenix – KASW 61 (ATSC 3.0 TV Station) / KNXV-TV (ATSC 1.0 Simulcast)
 Tucson – KWBA-TV 58

Arkansas
 Fayetteville – KHOG-DT2 29.2 (satellite of KHBS)CW+, 1
 Fort Smith – KHBS-DT2 40.2CW+, 1
 Jonesboro – KAIT-DT3 8.3CW+, 1
 Little Rock – KASN 38

California
 Bakersfield – KGET-DT2 17.2CW+, 1, 4
 Chico – KHSL-DT2 12.2CW+, 1
 El Centro (Yuma, Arizona) – KECY-DT3 9.3CW+, 1
 Eureka – KECA-LD 29.1
 Los Angeles – KTLA 5
 Monterey – KCBA 35CW+
 Palm Springs – KCWQ-LD 2 / KESQ-DT3 2.3 (simulcast of KCWQ-LP)CW+, 1
 Sacramento – KMAX-TV 31
 San Diego – KFMB-DT2 8.2
 San Francisco – KBCW 44
 Sanger (Fresno) – KFRE-TV 59 (ATSC 3.0 TV Station) / KGPE (ATSC 1.0 Simulcast)
 San Luis Obispo (Santa Barbara) – KSBY-DT2 6.2CW+, 1

Colorado
 Colorado Springs – KXTU-LD 57
 Denver – KWGN-TV 2 (ATSC 3.0 TV Station) / KDVR (ATSC 1.0 Simulcast)
 Grand Junction – KJCT-LD2 8.21

Connecticut
 Waterbury (Hartford) – WCCT-TV 20 (ATSC 3.0 TV Station) / WTIC-TV (ATSC 1.0 Simulcast)

Delaware
 None; served by WPSG Philadelphia and WMDT-DT2 Salisbury, Maryland

District of Columbia
 Washington, D.C. – WDCW 507

Florida
 Clermont (Orlando) – WKCF 18
 Gainesville – WCJB-DT2 20.2CW+, 1
 Jacksonville – WCWJ 17
 Miami – WSFL-TV 39
 Naples (Fort Myers) – WXCW 46
 Panama City – WJHG-DT2 7.21
 St. Petersburg (Tampa) – WTOG 44
 Tallahassee – WTLF 24CW+
 West Palm Beach – WTVX 34

Georgia
 Albany – WGCW-LD 36
 Atlanta – WUPA 69
 Augusta – WAGT-CD2 26.2CW+, 1
 Bainbridge – WTLH-DT2 49.2CW+, 1 (simulcast of WTLF/Tallahassee, Florida)
 Savannah – WSAV-DT2 3.2
 Columbus – WLTZ-DT2 38.21
 Macon – WMAZ-DT2 13.2CW+, 1, 4

Hawaii
 Hilo – KHAW-DT2 11.2 (satellite of KHON-DT2)CW+, 1
 Honolulu – KHON-DT2 2.2CW+, 1
 Wailuku – KAII-DT2 7.2 (satellite of KHON-DT2)CW+, 1

Idaho
 Boise – KYUU-LD 35 / KBOI-DT2 2.2CW+, 1
 Idaho Falls – KIFI-DT3 8.3CW+, 1
 Twin Falls – KMVT-DT2 11.2CW+, 1

Illinois
 Chicago – WCIU-TV 26
 Decatur (Springfield) – WBUI 23
 Peoria – WEEK-DT3 25.3CW+, 1
 Rockford – WREX-DT2 13.2CW+, 1
 Quincy – WGEM-DT2 10.2CW+, 1

Indiana
 Evansville – WTVW 7
 Fort Wayne – WISE-TV 33CW+, 4
 Indianapolis – WISH-TV 8
 Lafayette – WLFI-DT2 18.2CW+, 1
 South Bend – WCWW-LD 25
 Terre Haute – WTHI-TV 10.4

Iowa
 Ames (Des Moines) – KCWI-TV 23
 Burlington (Davenport/Quad Cities) – KGCW 26
 Ottumwa – KYOU-DT4CW+, 1
 Sioux City – KTIV-DT2 4.2CW+, 1
 Waterloo (Cedar Rapids) – KCRG-DT3 9.3

Kansas
 Topeka – KTKA-DT3 49.3CW+, 1
 Wichita – KSCW-DT 33 (ATSC 3.0 TV Station) / KWCH-DT (ATSC 1.0 Simulcast)

Kentucky
 Bowling Green – WBKO-DT2 13.2CW+, 1
 Lexington – WKYT-DT2 27.21
 Louisville – WBKI 58 (ATSC 3.0 TV Station) / WAVE (ATSC 1.0 Simulcast)
 Paducah – WQWQ-LP 9

Louisiana
 Alexandria – KALB-DT3 5.3
 Baton Rouge – WBRL-CD 21 / WGMB-DT2 44.2 (simulcast of WBRL-CD)
 Lafayette – KATC-DT2 3.2CW+, 1
 Lake Charles – KPLC-DT2 7.2CW+
 Monroe – KNOE-DT3 8.3 / KCWL-LD 40CW+, 1
 New Orleans – WNOL-TV 38
 Shreveport – KPXJ 21 (ATSC 3.0 TV Station) / KTBS-TV (ATSC 1.0 Simulcast)

Maine
 Bangor – WABI-DT2 5.2CW+, 1
 Portland – WPXT 51
 Presque Isle – WAGM-DT3 8.3 CW+, 1

Maryland
 Baltimore – WNUV 54 (ATSC 3.0 TV Station) / WMPT and WMPB (ATSC 1.0 Simulcast)
 Salisbury – WMDT-DT2 47.2CW+, 1

Massachusetts
 Boston – WLVI 56
 Springfield – WWLP-DT2 / WFXQ-CD2 22.2CW+, 1, 4

Michigan
 Alpena – "WBAE"CW+, 2, 3
 Bay City (Flint) – WBSF 46 (ATSC 3.0 TV Station) / WEYI-TV (ATSC 1.0 Simulcast)
 Cadillac (Traverse City) – WFQX-DT2 32.2CW+, 1
 Calumet (Marquette) – WBKP 5
 Detroit – WKBD-TV 50
 Kalamazoo (Grand Rapids) – WWMT-DT2 3.21
 Lansing – WLAJ-DT2 53.2CW+, 1, 3

Minnesota
 Duluth – KDLH 3CW+
 Mankato – KMNF-LD2 7.2CW+, 1 
 Minneapolis – WUCW 23
 Rochester – KTTC-DT2 10.2CW+, 1

Mississippi
 Columbus (Tupelo) – WCBI-DT3 4.3CW+, 1
 Greenwood – "WBWD"CW+, 2, 3
 Gulfport (Biloxi) – WXXV-DT3 25.3CW+, 1
 Hattiesburg – WHLT-DT2 22.21
 Jackson – WJTV-DT2 12.21
 Meridian – WTOK-DT3 11.3CW+, 1

Missouri
 Cape Girardeau – KFVS-DT2 12.2 (simulcast of WQTV-LP)
 Columbia – KOMU-DT3 8.3CW+, 1
 Kansas City – KCWE 294
 Joplin – KFJX-DT2 14.2CW+, 1
 Saint Joseph – KNPG-LD2 21.2CW+, 4, 8
 St. Louis – KPLR-TV 11 (ATSC 3.0 TV Station) / KTVI (ATSC 1.0 Simulcast)
 Springfield – KSPR-LD2 33.2 / KYTV-DT2 33.21

Montana
 Billings – KTVQ-DT2 2.2CW+, 1
 Butte – KXLF-DT2 4.2CW+, 1
 Great Falls – KRTV-DT2 3.2CW+, 1
 Helena – KTVH-DT2 12.2CW+, 3
 Missoula – KPAX-DT2 8.2CW+, 1

Nebraska
 Lincoln – Hastings – Kearney – KCWH-LD 18.1CW+ / KNHL-DT3 5.3CW+, 1
 North Platte – KIIT-CD2 11.2CW+, 1
 Omaha – KPTM-DT3 42.3

Nevada
 Las Vegas – KVCW 33 (ATSC 3.0 TV Station) / KSNV (ATSC 1.0 Simulcast)
 Reno – KOLO-DT3 8.3CW+, 1, 4

New Hampshire
 none (served by WLVI/Boston, Massachusetts; WNNE/Montpelier, Vermont; WPXT/Portland, Maine; and WWLP-DT2/Springfield, Massachusetts)

New Jersey
 none (served by WPIX/New York City and WPSG/Philadelphia)

New Mexico
 Roswell – KRWB-TV 21 (satellite of KWBQ)
 Santa Fe (Albuquerque) – KWBQ 19

New York
 Binghamton – WBNG-DT2 12.2CW+, 3
 Buffalo – WNLO 23
 Elmira – WENY-DT3 36.3CW+, 1
 New York City – WPIX 11
 Rochester – WHAM-DT2 13.2CW+, 1
 Schenectady (Albany) – WCWN 45 (ATSC 3.0 TV Station) / WTEN (ATSC 1.0 Simulcast)
 Syracuse – WSTM-DT2 3.2CW+
 Utica – WKTV-DT3 2.3CW+, 1
 Watertown – WWTI-DT2 50.2CW+, 1

North Carolina
 Asheville (Greenville, SC) – WYCW 62
 Charlotte – WCCB 18
 Greenville – WNCT-DT2 9.2CW+, 1
 Lexington (Greensboro) – WCWG 20
 Raleigh – WLFL 22
 Wilmington – WWAY-DT3 3.3CW+, 1, 4

North Dakota
 Bismarck – KXMB-DT2 12.2CW+, 1
 Dickinson – KXMA-DT1 2.1CW+, 1
 Minot – KXMC-DT2 13.2CW+, 1
 Williston – KXMD-DT2 11.2CW+, 1
 Fargo – KXJB-LD2 30.2/28.2CW+, 1

Ohio
 Cincinnati – WKRC-DT 12.21
 Lorain (Cleveland) – WUAB 43
 Columbus – WWHO 53 (ATSC 3.0 TV Station) / WTTE (ATSC 1.0 Simulcast)
 Springfield (Dayton) – WBDT 26
 Portsmouth (Charleston, WV) – WQCW 30
 Toledo – WTVG-DT2 13.21, 5
 Youngstown – WFMJ-DT2 21.2, 1
 Zanesville – "WBZV"CW+, 2

Oklahoma
 Ada (Sherman, TX) – KTEN-DT2 10.2CW+, 1
 Oklahoma City – KOCB 34
 Tulsa – KQCW-DT 19

Oregon
 Bend – KTVZ-DT2 21.2CW+, 1
 Eugene – KMTR-DT2 16.2CW+, 1
 Medford – KTVL-DT2 10.2CW+, 1
 Portland – KRCW-TV 32 (ATSC 3.0 TV Station) / KATU (ATSC 1.0 Simulcast)

Pennsylvania
 Erie – WSEE-DT2 35.2CW+, 1
 Harrisburg – WHP-DT3 21.31
 Johnstown – WJAC-DT4 6.4CW+, 1
 Philadelphia – WPSG 57
 Pittsburgh – WPCW 19
 Scranton – WSWB 38 / WOLF-DT2 56.2

Rhode Island
 Providence – WNAC-DT2 64.2

South Carolina
 Charleston – WCBD-DT2 2.21, 4
 Columbia – WIS-DT2 10.2
 Florence (Myrtle Beach) – WPDE-DT2 15.2

South Dakota
 Rapid City – KCLO-DT2 15.2CW+, 1
 Sioux Falls – KSFY-DT2 13.2CW+, 1

Tennessee
 Cleveland (Chattanooga) – WFLI-TV 53
 Crossville (Knoxville) – WBXX-TV 20
 Jackson – WNBJ-LD2 39.2CW+, 1
 Memphis – WLMT 30
 Nashville – WZTV-DT2 17.2

Texas
 Abilene – KTXS-DT2 12.2CW+, 1
 Amarillo – KVII-DT2 7.2CW+, 1
 Austin – KNVA 54
 Beaumont – KFDM-DT2 6.2CW+, 1
 Belton (Waco) – KNCT 46
 Big Spring – KCWO-TV 4
 Bryan (College Station) – KBTX-DT2 3.2CW+, 1 
 Corpus Christi – KRIS-DT2 6.2CW+, 1
 Dallas – KDAF 33 
 El Paso – KVIA-DT2 7.2CW+, 1
 Houston – KIAH 39 (ATSC 3.0 TV Station) / KPRC-TV (ATSC 1.0 Simulcast)
 Laredo – KYLX-LD2 13.2CW+, 1
 Lubbock – KLCW-TV 22CW+
 McAllen (Brownsville) – KCWT-CD 21 / KMBH-LD2 67.2 / KXFX-CD2 67.2 (KMBH-LD2 and KXFX-CD2 simulcast KCWT-CD)CW+, 1
 Nacogdoches (Tyler) – KYTX-DT2 19.2CW+, 1
 Odessa (Midland) – KOSA-DT2 7.2CW+, 1 (Satellite of KCWO-TV Big Spring)
 San Angelo – KTXE-LD2 38.2CW+, 3
 San Antonio – WOAI-DT2 4.2
 Victoria – KVCT-DT3 19.3CW+, 1
 Wichita Falls – KAUZ-DT2 6.2CW+, 1

Utah
 Ogden – KUCW 30

Vermont
 Montpelier (Burlington) – WNNE 31

Virginia
 Bristol (Tri-Cities, TN-VA) – WCYB-DT2 5.21
 Charlottesville – WVIR-DT3 29.3CW+, 1 / WVIR-CD3 29.3CW+, 1
 Harrisonburg – WSVW-LD2/W22EX-D2 30.2CW+, 1
 Lynchburg – WWCW 21
 Portsmouth (Norfolk) – WGNT 27
 Richmond – WUPV 65 / WWBT (ATSC 1.0 Simulcast)
 Roanoke – WFXR-DT2 27.21 (Satellite of WWCW Lynchburg)

Washington
 Pasco – KEPR-DT2 19.2 (satellite of KIMA-TV)CW+, 1
 Spokane – KSKN 22
 Tacoma (Seattle) – KSTW 11
 Yakima – KIMA-DT2 29.2CW+, 1

West Virginia
 Bluefield – WVVA-DT2 6.2CW+, 1
 Clarksburg – WVFX-DT2 46.21
 Huntington – WOCW-LP 45 (repeater of WQCW)
 Parkersburg – WOVA-LD2 22.2CW+, 1
 Wheeling – "WBWO"CW+, 2, 3

Wisconsin
 Crandon – WMOW 4CW+
 Eagle River – WYOW-DT2 34.2 (simulcast of WMOW; satellite of WAOW)CW+, 1
 Eau Claire – WQOW-DT2 18.2 (simulcast of WXOW)CW+, 1
 La Crosse – WXOW-DT2 19.2CW+, 1
 Madison – WMTV-DT2 15.2
 Milwaukee – WVTV 18
 Suring (Green Bay) – WCWF 14 (ATSC 3.0 TV Station) / WLUK-TV (ATSC 1.0 Simulcast)
 Wausau – WAOW-DT2 9.2 (simulcast of WMOW)CW+, 1

Wyoming
 Casper – KCWY-DT2 13.21
 Cheyenne – KGWN-DT2 5.2CW+, 1

Other areas

U.S. territories

Guam
 Hagåtña – KTKB-LD 26

See also
 List of The CW affiliates (table)

Notes

1 These stations carry the CW on a digital subchannel, which is available to viewers of digital television. Most of these digital subchannels should also be available in their respective markets through local cable and satellite television providers, depending on provider availability of the affiliate.
2 Local affiliate operates as cable-only channel.
3 Local affiliate previously operated as a broadcast and/or cable-only channel as part of The WB 100+ Station Group.
4 Local affiliate previously operated as a cable-only channel as part of The WB 100+ Station Group and/or The CW Plus.
5 Local affiliate previously operated as a cable-only channel that was not associated with The WB 100+ Station Group or The CW Plus.
6 These stations serve as a primary affiliate of The CW and as a secondary affiliate of MyNetworkTV.
7 In areas of the United States where CW programming is not available on the provider through a local affiliate, WDCW is available to DirecTV subscribers on channel 385.
8 KCWE is available to cable subscribers in parts of the St. Joseph market, as are the other Kansas City network affiliates.
9 KXVO is available to DirecTV subscribers in the St. Joseph market.

References

External links
 Official list of CW-affiliated stations

The CW
The CW
Affiliates